Gloria Sabrina Gómez Delgado (born May 14, 1962) is a Venezuelan singer, composer, actress, lawyer and TV presenter known by her professional name Kiara.

Life and career
Kiara was born in Barquisimeto, Venezuela. She took her first steps into the entertainment world when she joined her school choir but, because of her distinctive, powerful voice, the rest of the members didn't feel she blended in well and wasn't allowed to stay in their musical ensemble. However, her love for music remained a part of her life and she would constantly sing for her friends, backed up with a guitar. After graduating from UCAB's law school in Caracas, she decided to pursue a recording career.

One day, a friend talked her into recording a demo tape and submitting it to the two biggest record labels, Sonografica and SonoRodven in Venezuela. At first, she was to be signed to Sonografica. But a coincidental interaction with famous singer, songwriter and producer Rudy La Scala changed it all. As Kiara explains, her visual and singing caught the attention of La Scala. He immediately showed her how impressed he was with her and wanted her to sing the songs he had written. She accepted to record and produce with La Scala and was quickly signed to SonoRodven for the recording of her debut album in 1987. Before the album’s release, she was told she had to pick a stage name out of 5 options that were presented to her. She was going to use her actual name “Sabrina”, but the company thought it would lead to confusion because there was another Italian artist with the same name as “Sabrina”. The name “Kiara” was presented to her and she immediately picked it, as it is from a Venezuelan native (indigenous) Princess from the state of Yaracuy, not too far from where the singer was born.

In over 20 years, she has recorded six successful studio albums exploring different genres such as Latin pop, rock, ballads and even boleros. She also performed in some of the most important musical events in Latin America, including the Viña del Mar International Song Festival.

Besides her singing career, she has acted in several telenovelas in various Latin American countries, hosted different TV shows and even coached contestants on televised singing competitions.

Discography

Albums

Singles

The song Luna De Plata (My One And Only) was originally recorded by Thomas Anders (of Modern Talking fame) in 1992 on his album Down on Sunset.

Selected filmography
2016: Piel salvaje ... Patricia de Aragón de la Rosa
2008: Nadie me dirá como quererte .... Laura Carbonell
2006: Te tengo en salsa .... Azalea Montiel De Perroni
2006: Y los declaro marido y mujer .... Lola
2005: Amor a Palos .... Patricia Lara
2004: Estrambotica Anastasia .... Bromelia de Borosfky
2003: La mujer de Judas .... Laura Briceño
2000: Amantes de Luna Llena .... Lorena Santamaría
1998: Reina de corazones .... Luisa Elena
1992: Macarena   .... Macarena

References

External links

RCTV.net entry on Kiara (In Spanish)

1962 births
Living people
People from Barquisimeto
20th-century Venezuelan women singers
Venezuelan telenovela actresses
Venezuelan television personalities
Venezuelan pop singers
Andrés Bello Catholic University alumni
Rodven Records artists
21st-century Venezuelan women singers